Bute County, North Carolina is a former county in eastern North Carolina. In 1779, it was divided into Franklin County and Warren County and ceased to exist.

History
Bute County was established on June 10, 1764, from the eastern part of Granville County by the North Carolina General Assembly and named for John Stuart, 3rd Earl of Bute, Prime Minister of Great Britain from 1762 to 1763. It was formed in order to bring the residents of the eastern half of Granville County with improved access to local government, particularly those residing in St. John's Parish. It was expanded in 1766 to include the northwest part of Northampton County.

The residents of Bute County were very much opposed to British rule.  When governor William Tryon called for troops to counter the Regulator Movement in 1768, his orders were ignored by the Bute County militia.  In the 1770s, it was claimed that "There were no Tories in Bute". After the Provincial Congress of 1775 and 1776, an act was proposed to divide Bute County. After more than two years of discussion, Bute County was divided on January 20, 1779, generally along the Shocco Creek, with Warren County in the north and Franklin County to the south.

The Bute County courthouse was located along Buffalo Rice Path, on land owned by Jethro Sumner. This location is about six miles southeast of Warrenton, North Carolina.  There was one other town in Bute County, a town without a post office called Littleton.  Most of the records of Bute county are located in Warren County.

Notable residents
Thomas Eaton
William Person

See also

 List of former United States counties
 List of North Carolina counties

References

External links
Bute County, North Carolina at the USGenWeb Project
Bute County, North Carolina at carolana.com

 
1764 establishments in North Carolina
1779 disestablishments in North Carolina
Former counties of North Carolina